The Saturn Curve was a roadster concept by Saturn designed by Michael Mauer who was the former head of design at Saab Automobile. It was shown at the 2004 North American International Auto Show along with the Saturn Sky concept.

This project would also evolve to a new "Saab Sonett", with a different front styling, but ultimately Saab's intentions to make it an AWD car did not come true, and Saturn opted to go with the Opel project   giving birth to the Saturn Sky.

References

External links
Photo of the Saturn Curve

Curve
General Motors concept cars